The SSh-68 (Russian: СШ-68 [стальной шлем образца 1968 года/stalnoy shlyem], English: SSh-68 steel helmet model 1968) - is a steel combat helmet of the Soviet and then Russian Armed Forces. The SSh-68 is a further development of the SSh-60 helmet. It differs primarily in its greater strength, greater front slope of the dome and the shorter outer edge. It is usually painted in dark green.

The helmet weighs 1,300 grams (with leatherette balaclavas - 1,500 grams). SSh-68 provides protection from impact shock (machetes, etc.), and steel fragments (shrapnel) weighing 1.0 grams at speeds up to 250 m/s. The SSh-68 is not meant to protect against bullets.

The SSh-68 was used by the armed forces of the Soviet Union and its Warsaw Pact allies, and others. Today, it is still in service in most countries of the CIS, as well as Vietnam and Afghanistan.

Due to the introduction of improved helmets starting with the original 6B7, the SSh-68 was progressively withdrawn from service. In the Russian Armed Forces, the final examples are being gradually replaced by the newer 6B7-1M and 6B47 helmets.

Variants

 SSh-68M/СШ-68М (GRAU index - 6B14) - A modernization of SSh-68 by installing an aramid fiber liner, called SVM, inside the helmet, as well as modern harness belt and restraint systems. As a result, the mass of the helmet is increased to 1.9 kg. The helmet is designed by "Special equipment and communication", for the personnel of the Russian Ministry of the Interior Internal Troops. The SSh-68M provides head protection of class 1 (pistol and revolver bullets). It's manufactured by NII Stali.
 SSh-68N "blank"/Заготовка  (Grau index - 6B14) - Modernization of SSh-68 by increasing the thickness of the aramid membrane inside the helmet, as well as by the installation of modern harness belt and restraint systems. As a result, the mass of the helmet is increased to 2 kg. This helmet is designed for the personnel of the Russian armed forces. The helmet protects the head in class 1 (9×18mm Makarov pistol and revolver bullets), as well as from fragments of steel of spherical mass of 1.1 g (6.3 mm diameter of fragment) up to 400 m/s.

Sizing
SSh-68 are available in three different sizes, P1, P2, and P3.  P1 (small) is good to about a 58 head, size 2 (medium) is between about 59 and 61 and size 3 (Large to extra large) is from 61 up. SSh-68s are not sized as NATO helmets are since they are designed to be able to adjust for soldiers to wear an Ushanka or other heavy hat underneath it during the winter.

Replacement 
In early 2000s the Russian military attempted to replace the SSh-68 with the new 6B7 helmet, which was never widely used. By the 2010s a new model, the 6B27 (see :ru:6Б27) largely replaced SSh-68 in Russian service, but the old helmet is still in limited use by the Russian Armed Forces. In other post-Soviet states (except for Baltic countries and Georgia) there are still large stocks of SSh-68 in use, although in Ukraine it was sporadically replaced by Kaska-1M (see :ru:Каска-1М).

Users

Current

: Donations made from Moscow in October 2017.
: Limited numbers still in service as of 2022.

Former

See also
 Sfera

Notes

External links

 Каска СШ-68 (Ukrainian)
 Who needs a Steel helmet?  (Russian)

Combat helmets of Russia
Soviet military uniforms
Military equipment introduced in the 1960s